The Rover 75 is an executive car manufactured initially by the Rover Group and later by MG Rover, under the Rover marque and available over a single generation with front-wheel drive in either saloon/sedan or station wagon/estate configurations. Later variants included an extended-wheelbase model, and a rear-wheel drive variant with a V8 engine. In 2001, MG Rover launched a badge engineered variant, the MG ZT. A coupe concept was built, but did not receive further development.

Rover 75s were manufactured by the Rover Group at Cowley, Oxfordshire, for one year. After owner BMW sold Rover, the 75 was manufactured by the new MG Rover Group at their Longbridge site in Birmingham.

The Rover 75 debuted at the Birmingham Motor Show, with deliveries commencing in February 1999. As the last Rover executive sedan/saloon, production of all models ended in 2005 when MG Rover Group entered receivership.

History
The Rover 75 started life as part of a group of three new designs for the company under the guidance of Richard Woolley; a large saloon codenamed Flagship, a smaller vehicle (with the codename of Eric), and the 75. Of these only the 75 concept progressed. The initial aim was to reskin the Rover 600 (launched in April 1993) but following the BMW takeover in 1994, it was quickly decided that this platform would not be reused but replaced by an entirely new model, scheduled for launch in the late 1990s.

Work on the new model, codenamed R40, progressed with little operational interference from BMW; the styling received an enthusiastic response from the management and both companies believed the classical look would be the ideal direction for Rover.  Advanced design processes included 3D virtual reality assembly simulations.

The Rover 75 debuted at the Birmingham Motor Show on 20 October 1998 and went on sale until 17 June 1999 having been extensively tested by the motoring press.

The 75 featured a range of petrol and diesel engines from 1.8- to 2.5-litre sizes. Petrol engines provided were Rover's 4-cylinder K series in 1.8-litre guise and the quad cam KV6, offered in either short-stroke 2.0 or revised 2.5-litre formats. The 2.0-litre was later dropped on introduction of the 1.8-litre turbo for emissions purposes.
A diesel engine was provided through BMW Group channels. Engineered by Rover Group and Steyr engineers for transverse mounting, the 4-cylinder M47R (M47 Rail) differed from M47D20 engines found in the E46 3 Series and E39 5 Series by featuring a direct injection common-rail system, different turbocharger and more sophisticated systems for temperature management.

Transmissions on all models were either the Getrag 283 5-speed manual, supplied from the company's new facility in Bari, Italy, or the JATCO 5-speed automatic unit — one of the first transverse engine deployments made with this feature.

Disk brakes at all four wheels were augmented by a Bosch 5.7 4-channel ABS system and electronic brake force distribution. The parking brake was a cable operated drum integral within the rear discs.

Suspension was via front MacPherson struts, anchored by alloy lower L-arms and widely spaced mounting points. The rear suspension was a version of BMW's Z-Axle arrangement used on the 1988 Z1 sports car.

The 75 won a series of international awards.

Assembly originally took place at Cowley but in 2000, following the sale of the company by BMW to Phoenix Venture Holdings, production was moved to Longbridge in Birmingham, England. 2001 saw the introduction of the Rover 75 Tourer (developed alongside the saloon but never authorised for production by BMW), swiftly followed by the MG ZT and MG ZT-T, more sporting interpretations of the model, differentiated by modified, sporting chassis settings and colour and trim derivatives. Between 2000 and 2003, there were few changes to the range: the most significant was the replacement of the 2-litre V6 engine by a low-pressure-turbocharged version of the 1.8-litre 4-cylinder engine. The introduction of the 'greener' 1.8-litre turbo greatly benefited British company car drivers who are taxed on carbon dioxide emissions. A customisation programme, Monogram, was launched, allowing buyers to order their car in a wider range of exterior paint colours and finishes, different interior trims and with optional extras installed during production. Rather surprisingly, it was offered for sale in Mexico, making it the first Rover to be sold in the Americas since the Sterling.

From June 2002 a factory-approved dual-fuel petrol/liquid petroleum gas conversion was available in the UK on 1.8 and 2.5-litre models. The LPG conversion was an after-market undertaking approved by MG Rover. Developed by EcoGas Systems Ltd and Landi Renzo S.R.L. in conjunction with MG Rover Powertrain Limited, the conversion was ordered from Rover dealerships, the cars retaining the three-year factory warranty. The retail price of the conversion was £2,195, but in an effort to encourage LPG use for transport, for ecological reasons, the UK Government offered a Powershift Rebate of some 60% of the conversion cost. When running on LPG the Rover 75 suffers only a slight reduction in performance compared to running on petrol; LPG fuel consumption is also slightly higher than when running on petrol but this is more than offset by the greatly reduced cost of the fuel.

Tourer
Rover released the station wagon/estate bodystyle of the 75, called Tourer, in July 2001. The tailgate featured an optional opening rear glass section.  The load space was up to 1,480 mm wide and 2,060 mm long. With the seats up there was 400 to 680 litres of cargo space, and with the seats folded down (in a 60:40 ratio complete with centre load-through hatch) there is 1,222 litres available.

Self-levelling rear suspension and an integral load restraint system were optional for the Tourer. Up to 100 kg can be loaded onto the roof, and the rear sill has a height of 544 mm. Four hinged chrome lashing eyes are fitted to the floor, and oddment stowage compartments and two recessed hooks are located in the side walls.

Long Wheelbase

A stretched version of the Rover 75 — initially called Vanden Plas (later simply Limousine) was introduced in 2002. Developed in conjunction with vehicle builder S. MacNeillie & Son Limited in Walsall, England, the model was stretched by 200 mm in the rear floor pan and altering the rear doors. Available only in Connoisseur specification, production moved to Longbridge after an initial short run by MacNeillie.
The 75 was a ministerial car in the British Government, Tony Blair having access to one while he was Prime Minister. Alistair Darling was seen in a long wheelbase Rover 75.

Rover 75 V8

Rover announced a V8 model at the Geneva Motor Show in 2004. This was the second iteration of the rear-wheel-drive platform developed from the front-wheel-drive Rover 75 platform by MG Rover, following the MG ZT 260 introduced in 2003, and was the first V8-engined Rover since the demise of the Rover SD1 in 1986. The platform was extensively re-engineered for Ford's 4.6 litre Modular V8 and rear-wheel-drive, including a stiffened tunnel and bespoke rear suspension. 

As with the ZT 260, the 75 V8 was built on the standard production line, removed to allow the necessary structural modifications and installation of the V8 drivetrain, then returned to the line for final trim. Instead of the MG ZT 260's Tremec TR-3650 manual gearbox, the Rover 75 V8 featured Ford's 4R75W 4-speed automatic transmission. Other features included non-standard heating and ventilation, revised brakes and suspension, quad exhaust pipes, special badging, and a "premium" front bumper featuring a deeper grille. 166 were produced in both saloon and tourer body styles, compared with 717 MG ZT 260s, for a total of 883 V8 cars.

A heavily modified MG ZT-T V8, known as the X-15 broke the speed record for a non-production estate car on Bonneville Salt Flats in September 2003, achieving . The engine was bored out to 6 litres producing , but remained normally aspirated.

Facelift

Exterior
In the northern hemisphere spring of 2004, Rover introduced a facelifted 75 featuring an entirely new front grille and bumper with one-piece headlights with halogen projectors. The rear also featured a new bumper with a revised chrome boot handle. The "premium" grille usually reserved for V8 and long-wheelbase models, was also applied to the limited edition CDTi Sport model in Portugal. This version, with blacked-out trim and 17-inch alloy wheels, was otherwise a Connoisseur SE spec, celebrating Rover's centenary in Portugal.

Interior

Classic SE, Club and Club SE trim levels were dropped, and on Connoisseur trim light oak wood took the place of the original walnut, which remained standard fitment on the entry-level Classic trim. Rover also added a new trim to the range called Contemporary which featured revised fittings such as larger alloy wheels, body colour exterior accents, black oak wood trim and sports seats as well as an altered equipment.  The instrumentation and its back-lighting were revised, the console texture finish was revised and the seat bolsters revised.  Access to the rear seats was improved and leg-room increased.

Technical
Steering received revised ratios from the MG ZT.  Suspension was reworked.

Gallery
Pre-facelift styling

Post-facelift styling

Engine specifications
The Rover 75 (and MG ZT derivative) were powered by a combination of Rover's own petrol and LPG K-Series and KV6 engines as well as Ford's Modular V8 and BMW's M47 diesel engine. The latter was designated M47R to identify the unit as a Rover special.

Environmental impact
Each engine fitted to the Rover and MG flagships were analysed and given a score between 0 (cleanest) to 100 (dirtiest) by Next Green Car.

Safety
The Rover 75 was designed with reinforced footwells, underfloor box beams, side impact bars and a "ring of steel" around each door opening to prevent jamming in case of an impact. Driver and front passenger head and side airbags are fitted as standard, with side head "windowbags" available as an option until 2005 when they became standard equipment. If the window airbags had been standard equipment at the time of its Euro NCAP crash test in 2001, it would have scored the full five stars for the adult occupant impact rating. Also fitted are disc brakes all round, anti-lock brakes (ABS), electronic brakeforce distribution (EBD) with a traction control system (TCS) available as an option on 2.0 engines and above. On models fitted with Rover's Hi-Line infotainment system, a speed warning indicator was also included.  Additionally, electronic stability control (ESC) was due to be made standard fitment on the 75 from the 2006 model year onwards.

The 75 underwent Euro NCAP and ANCAP car safety tests in 2001.

The Rover 75 achieved the following ratings:

All seats have anti-submarine ramps and three-point inertia reel seat belts with pre-tensioners, while the front seats get additional load limiters and automatic belt height adjustment as standard. In certain markets a seat belt reminder for the driver was fitted. Each seat has an adjustable head restraint with the front ones pivoting on SE models. Thatcham's NCWR organisation (New Car Whiplash Ratings) tested the Rover 75 and awarded it the following scores:

G = Good
A = Acceptable
M = Marginal
P = Poor

Security
A perimetric (and optional volumetric) alarm, engine immobiliser and remote-control central locking with deadbolts are standard equipment on the 75. Alloy wheels are fitted with locking wheel nuts. Automatic locking when driving off is standard, but can be disabled by a dealer. On the inside is a master locking switch and the boot can only be opened by remote control or an interior button. A battery back-up sounder and tracking device called Trackstar were available as options.

The 75 was tested by Thatcham's New Vehicle Security Ratings (NVSR) organisation and achieved the following ratings:

Popularity
Initial sales of the Rover 75 failed to match the BMW 3 Series and Audi A4 in the British car sales charts during 1999. The public unveiling of the car at the Birmingham Motor Show drew favourable reactions, but was unfortunately overshadowed by a press conference afterwards by BMW chairman, Bernd Pischetsrieder, containing criticism of the UK Government's attitude to financial assistance in the redevelopment of the Rover Longbridge factory (where the new Mini and R30 were to have been produced), and effectively suggesting that Rover was in crisis. Press reaction interpreted this as saying that BMW were unhappy with continuing financial losses and were intending to close Rover down. This undoubtedly scared off many prospective buyers, despite the very positive reaction to the car itself. Indeed, it did (and still does) hold up very well with the Jaguar S-Type that was unveiled at the same show. Rover's brand image also hurt the 75 against competitors despite its positive reception.

Sales picked up substantially during 2000, and it was Britain's fifth-most popular new car in the month of April of that year. It was still selling reasonably well at the time of MG Rover's bankruptcy in April 2005, and a small number of unsold 75s were still in stock as of early-2007, as Nanjing Automobile was preparing to reopen Longbridge.

Based on the combination of safety, performance and maintainability, the Rover 75 was found in 2011 to be the cheapest car to insure in the United Kingdom across all age groups.

Production

Models

1998 – 2004 (Mark I)

Classic
Classic SE
Club
Club SE
Connoisseur
Connoisseur SE
Vanden Plas (LWB model)

2004 – 2005 (Mark II)

Classic
Contemporary
Contemporary SE
Connoisseur
Connoisseur SE
Sport (Portugal)
Limousine (LWB model)

2006 – 2016 (Roewe 750)

1.8 Turbo Base (18K4G, modified Rover K-Series)
1.8 Turbo High-Line (18K4G, modified Rover K-Series)
2.5 Base (25K4F, modified Rover KV6)
2.5 High-Line o9629 (25K4F, modified Rover KV6)

Reviews
Auto Trader 'The 75's biggest problem was its image; potential buyers just assumed it was hopelessly outclassed by rivals. Nothing could be further from the truth though, as the car could compete on equal terms with some prestigious adversaries'
Honest John Positives: A fine looking car from all angles. Destined to become a classicNegatives: Let down by cooling system problems on all K-Series engines, particularly the 1.8
Parker's Pros: Rover refinement and heritage. Handsome looks and a charming, comfortable interior.Cons: Mid-range Audi, BMW and Mercedes-Benz [rivals].
RAC 'The Rover 75 Tourer is one of those rare ... cars that retains a genuine sense of occasion whenever you get behind the wheel. The retro clocks and the buttoned down rectitude of the detailing all contributes to a huge feel good factor.'
Verdict On Cars 'Recommended. The standard 75 has an elegance missing from German executive car rivals, with wood and leather harking back to a bygone age. The Tourer estate models are, surprisingly, even prettier and very practical indeed.'
What Car? For - It's excellent over long distances and smooths out bumps like a luxury car. It's cheap, well equipped and practical, and comes with olde-worlde charm.Against - The rear seats are cramped and you get a much sharper drive from its German rivals.
Which? For: rock-bottom prices | strong diesel engine | lots of equipment | comfortableAgainst: patchy reliability | hefty depreciation | no dealer network | limited warranty
Wise Buyer's 'The elegant 75 showed that Rover ... could build a quality executive car that's refined, reliable, good to drive [with] real presence.'

Awards and accolades
1999
What Car? – 'Car of the Year'
What Car? – 'Compact Executive Car of the Year'
What Car? – 'Diesel Car of the Year'
Auto Express – 'World Car'
Journal/AA – 'Business Car of the Year'
Italy - 'World's Most Beautiful High Class Saloon'
Bild am Sonntag – 'Golden Steering Wheel Award'
The Society of Plastic Engineers – Innovative Use of Plastic
British International Motor Show – Best Riding And Handling FWD Saloon in the World
Japan – 'Import Car of the Year' (1999–2000)
Middle East Wheels & Gears – 'Car of the Year'
2000
Middle East Wheels & Gears – 'Car of the Year'
New Zealand's National Business Review – 'Car of the Year'
Executive Class – 'Portuguese Car of the Year'
What Car? – 'Compact Executive Car of the Year'
2000 'European Car of the Year' Awards: Only Executive Car Short Listed
Used Car Buyer – 'Used Car of the Year'
2001
Used Car Buyer – 'Used Car of the Year'
Diesel Car Magazine – 'Compact Executive Car'
JD Power Survey – Only European Car in the Top 5
2002
Auto Express Used Car Honours – 'Best Diesel Car'
Used Car Buyer – 'Best Used Medium Car'
ITM – 'Car of the Year'
Australian Institute of Transport Management – 'Car of the Year'
2004
Used Car Buyer – 'Used Car of the Year'
Used Car Buyer – 'Best Used Family Car of the Year'
Most Popular British Armed Forces Tax Free Car Purchase
2006
Auto Express Driver Power – 'Best Ride Quality' (1st)
2007
Auto Trader Used Car Awards – 'Best Family Car'
2010
Auto Express Driver Power – 'Best Ride Quality' (2nd)
2011
Auto Express Driver Power – 'Best Ride Quality' (1st)

Chinese production

Production of the Rover 75 and MG ZT ended when MG Rover Group went into administration in April 2005. The Rover 75 design was purchased by Shanghai Automotive Industry Corporation (SAIC) in early 2005, although the new MG Rover Group owner, Nanjing Automobile Corporation (NAC) acquired the tooling for the car. Both companies launched revised versions of the 75/ZT in China. SAIC's model was named the Roewe 750 (following the purchase of the Rover brand by Ford, the Roewe marque was created by SAIC for use worldwide) and NAC's the MG 7.

The Roewe brand and Roewe 750 were launched at the Beijing Motor Show in November 2006. The 750 is based on the long-wheelbase 75 platform, and engineering was completed by Ricardo 2010.

The MG 7 was launched in March 2007.
NAC also introduced a long-wheelbase version of the MG 7, called the MG 7L.

Brilliance B8
Shortly before the collapse of Rover, Brilliance who had a deal with BMW like Rover was looking to expand their product line with a big saloon so they went to Rover to use the 75. As a demo, Rover exported 24 Brilliance B8s to China that were sold through dealerships although the cars were only meant to be prototypes. Because the deal never happened, they are still the only 24 Brilliance B8s.

References

External links

75
Compact executive cars
ANCAP large family cars
Euro NCAP large family cars
Station wagons
Front-wheel-drive vehicles
Rear-wheel-drive vehicles
Sports sedans
2000s cars
Cars introduced in 1998
Cars discontinued in 2005
Retro-style automobiles